High Living was the first soap opera to be produced in Scotland, and was produced by STV. The series was conceived by Henry Hay and episodes were written by Henry Hay and Jack Gerson, (who would later create The Omega Factor).

History

High Living featured the Crombie family (Andy, Kate and their children) who, in the first episode "The Flitting", moved into a new apartment in a high-rise apartment block in Glasgow called Caulton Court (the exterior shots in the opening credits were filmed in Wyndford in Glasgow).

A spin-off series entitled A Place of Her Own was first broadcast on 21 October 1971, and featured a newly widowed Kate Crombie (it ran for 13 episodes). It was also shown on Grampian Television shortly afterwards and on HTV during the summer of 1972.

Series
The first episode was broadcast on 5 December 1968. Originally episodes were 15 minutes long, broadcast three times a week; by March 1969 this changed to a 30 minute format broadcast on Thursday, with about 200 episodes being produced. The last episode was broadcast on 19 August 1971 on Scottish Television. All filmed episodes of High Living are believed to have been wiped, destroyed or lost but two scripts of High Living have survived, the first episode with a synopsis of the show and summary of characters and episode 137.

A number of other ITV companies did broadcast the series:

 Grampian Television: All episodes, 1969 – 1971.
 Border Television: All episodes, 1969 – 1971.
 HTV: from 1969 until mid 1970
 ATV and Southern Television: 6 January – July 1969, before being dropped.

Cast
 Tommy Crombie – John Buick
 Kate Crombie – Clare Richards
 Andy Crombie – Ken Henderson
 Chrissie Crombie – Jennifer Angus
 Meg Nairn – Emma Chapman
 Kipper Lynch – Phil McCall
 Nora Murdoch – Bobbie Willis

References

External links
 
 Article from the Evening Times (Glasgow)
 http://www.atvtoday.co.uk/forgotten-regional-soaps-3904/

1960s Scottish television series
1970s Scottish television series
1968 Scottish television series debuts
1971 Scottish television series endings
Scottish television soap operas
Television shows produced by Scottish Television
1968 establishments in Scotland
ITV soap operas
English-language television shows
1970s British television soap operas